The Three Brothers is a group of three mountain peaks at the north west end of the Allardyce Range on South Georgia. They aligned in a north–south direction, situated 4 miles (6 km) west of the head of Cumberland West Bay in the central part of South Georgia. The origin of the name which dates back to the 1930s is not certain.

On 25 January 2001, Caradog Jones made the first ascent, solo, of the highest of the Three Brothers peaks   This was part of a combined climbing and filming expedition, which resulted in five 30 minute programmes.  Recorded in Welsh, and entitled Haf Ganol Gaeaf (Summer Midst Winter), it was broadcast with English subtitles.  The series included :
 Sailing to get there and back
 History of the island
 South Georgia's wildlife
 First ascent of the 'Three Brothers'

References

Mountains and hills of South Georgia